Laurens van Hoepen (born 6 September 2005) is a Dutch racing driver who currently competes in the Formula Regional European Championship with ART Grand Prix, having previously raced in the Ultimate Cup Series in 2021.

Career

Karting 
Van Hoepen started karting at the age of eight in his native Netherlands, winning a series of national championships before jumping onto the international scene in 2015. A protégé of Formula 2 and Formula E champion Nyck de Vries, he won the IAME Euro Series in the X30 Mini class in 2017 and finished in the top ten of both the FIA European Championship and the WSK Champions Cup in OK in 2020, driving for Nico Rosberg's Racing Academy and Charles Leclerc's Leclerc by Lennox Racing respectively. For 2021 he remained with Leclerc's team and made the step up to KZ2 shifter karts, finishing third overall in the CIK-FIA Karting European Championship.

Formula Regional

2021 
He hit the ground running, winning his first ever single-seater race from pole at Le Mans, ahead of Formula E race winner and 24 Hours of Le Mans class winner Nico Prost. He would go on to win seven of the nine races he entered—enough to claim 3rd in the championship standings despite having missed the first half of the season.

2022 
For the 2022 season Van Hoepen moved to the Formula Regional European Championship with ART Grand Prix, partnering Gabriele Minì and Mari Boya.

2023 
Van Hoepen remained with ART Grand Prix for the 2023 Formula Regional European Championship.

Racing record

Karting career summary

Circuit career summary 

* Season still in progress.

Complete Ultimate Cup Series results 
(key) (Races in bold indicate pole position) (Races in italics indicate fastest lap)

Complete Formula Regional European Championship results 
(key) (Races in bold indicate pole position) (Races in italics indicate fastest lap)

* Season still in progress.

Complete Formula Regional Oceania Championship Results
(key) (Races in bold indicate pole position) (Races in italics indicate fastest lap)

References

External links 
 

2005 births
Living people
Dutch racing drivers
Formula Regional European Championship drivers
ART Grand Prix drivers
People from Wassenaar
Graff Racing drivers
Karting World Championship drivers
Toyota Racing Series drivers
M2 Competition drivers